Transitus is the tenth studio album by the Dutch progressive rock/metal band Ayreon. It was released on 25 September 2020. The album is accompanied by a 25 page comic book, not included with CD or vinyl, and illustrated by Felix Vega.

The album's plot is one of the few not connected to the main Ayreon storyline; instead, it presents a sci-fi/gothic horror story partially set in the 19th century.

A total of five music videos were released for the album. The two first came out on 16 July 2020 for the singles "Get Out! Now!" and "Hopelessly Slipping Away". The former covers the part in the story in which protagonist Daniel (Tommy Karevik) is banished from his house by his father (Dee Snider) for having an affair with their servant Abby (Cammie Gilbert). The song features a guitar solo by Joe Satriani. The other song follows Daniel's ghost as he tries to contact Abby, who can't hear nor see him but does feel his presence.

On 3 September, a video for "This Human Equation" featuring Simone Simons was released. According to Ayreon's mastermind Arjen Anthony Lucassen, it contains several references to the project's universe, besides the title, which alludes to their sixth album. On 17 September, a lyric video for "Talk of the Town" was released, featuring images of Paul Manzi performing as Henry and studio footage of the instrumentalists recording their parts. The final video, titled "Daniel’s Descent into Transitus Medley", was released on 1 October featuring Simons, Karevik, Marcela Bovio and Caroline Westendorp (the latter two as the Furies).

Track listing

Personnel 
Credits adapted from the album's media notes.

 Vocalists
 Tom Baker (actor for Doctor Who) – The Storyteller
 Tommy Karevik (Kamelot, Seventh Wonder) – Daniel
 Cammie Gilbert (Oceans of Slumber) – Abby
 Johanne James (Kyrbgrinder, drummer for Threshold) – Abraham
 Simone Simons (Epica) – The Angel of Death
 Marcela Bovio (ex-Stream of Passion) – Fury, Servant, Villager
 Caroline Westendorp (ex-The Charm the Fury) – Fury, Servant, Villager
 Paul Manzi (ex-Arena) – Henry
 Michael Mills (Toehider) – The Statue
 Dee Snider (Twisted Sister) – Father
 Amanda Sommerville (Trillium, HDK) – Lavinia
 Dianne van Giersbergen (Ex Libris) – Soprano
 Dan J. Pierson, Jan Willem Ketelaers, Lisette van den Berg, Marjan Welman, Will Shaw, Wilmer Waarbroek – Villagers
 Hellscore – Choir (directed by Noa Gruman)

 Instrumentalists
 Arjen Lucassen – Guitars, Bass, Keyboards, Glockenspiel, Dulcimer, Toy Piano
 Joost van den Broek – Hammond Organ, Piano, Fender Rhodes
 Juan van Emmerloot – Drums
 Ben Mathot – Violin
 Jeroen Goossens – Flutes, Woodwinds
 Jurriaan Westerveld – Cello
 Alex Thyssen – French Horn
 Thomas Cochrane – Trumpet, Trombone
 Patty Gurdy – Hurdy Gurdy
 Joe Satriani – Guitar Solo on "Get Out! Now!"
 Marty Friedman – Guitar Solo on "Message From Beyond"

Charts

Weekly charts

Year-end charts

References

External links 
 Arjen Anthony Lucassen – Official website
 

Progressive rock albums by Dutch artists
Ayreon albums
2020 albums
Concept albums